Taï Department is a department of Cavally Region in Montagnes District, Ivory Coast. In 2021, its population was 117,387 and its seat is the settlement of Taï. The sub-prefectures of the department are Taï and Zagné.

History
Taï Department was created in 2013 by dividing Guiglo Department. Ongoing instability in the south-western portion of the country prompted the creation of the department.

Notes

Departments of Cavally Region
States and territories established in 2013
2013 establishments in Ivory Coast